Ambassador Bill is a 1931 American Pre-Code comedy film directed by Sam Taylor and starring Will Rogers and Marguerite Churchill. The film also features Greta Nissen and Ray Milland.

Premise
Bill Harper (Rogers) plays an American ambassador. After his arrival in a small country that is besieged by civil unrest, he befriends the young boy (Tad Alexander) who is to be the country's king.

Cast

References

External links

1931 films
1931 comedy films
Films directed by Sam Taylor
American black-and-white films
American comedy films
Fox Film films
Films set in Europe
1930s English-language films
1930s American films